Rom: Dire Wraiths is a limited comic book series by Chris Ryall, Luca Pizzari, Guy Dorian Sr and Sal Buscema. It is based on the toy of the same name by Hasbro, and is published by IDW Publishing.

The series debuted on January 15, and concluded on December 30, 2020, following the impact of the COVID-19 pandemic on comic book industry.

Premise 
The main story features NASA's Apollo 11 astronaut crew during the 1969 Moon landing, where they will confront the inhuman presence of Dire Wraiths waiting to conquer Earth.

A back-up story features what happened to Rom during those events.

Publication history

Background 
After IDW Publishing acquired the comic book licence of Rom and other Hasbro brands, the company announced in January 2016 the Reconstruction campaign to converge these franchises in the Hasbro Comic Book Universe, featuring the crossover events Revolution and First Strike.

This shared continuity, the Hasbro Comic Book Universe (HCBU), ended with Transformers: Unicron in November 2018.

Development 
The series was revealed to be in development at San Diego Comic-Con 2019. The series contains three issues written by returning Rom writer Chris Ryall, with art by Luca Pizzari. A back-up story was written by Ryall, with art by returning artists Guy Dorian Sr. (pencils) and Sal Buscema (inks). Ryall said that "returning to Rom for any reason is a happy occasion. Being able to use this story as a way to celebrate the monumental journey of American heroes is even better".

The series debuted on January 15, 2020. Due to the effect of the COVID-19 pandemic over comic book industry, the third and final issue was delayed for December 30 the same year.

Issues

Reception

Collected editions

See also 
 Apollo 11 in popular culture

References

External links 
 IDW Publishing's official announcement

Apollo 11
Comics based on Hasbro toys
Cultural depictions of Neil Armstrong
Cultural depictions of Buzz Aldrin
Cultural depictions of Michael Collins (astronaut)
IDW Publishing titles
Rom the Space Knight
Fiction about outer space
United States in popular culture